Danylo Yevhenovych "Daniil" Sobchenko (13 April 1991 – 7 September 2011) was a Ukrainian-Russian professional ice hockey player. Born in Kyiv, Sobchenko spent the entirety of his professional hockey career with Lokomotiv Yaroslavl of the Kontinental Hockey League.  He was a member  of the Russian national team that competed in the IIHF World Championship's under 18 and under 20 levels; winning gold for the country in 2011.  Sobchenko was drafted 166th overall in the 2011 NHL Entry Draft by the San Jose Sharks. He died along with the entire Lokomotiv team in the 2011 Lokomotiv Yaroslavl plane crash on the first day of the 2011–12 season.

Death

On 7 September 2011, Sobchenko was killed when a Yakovlev Yak-42 passenger aircraft, carrying nearly his entire Lokomotiv team, crashed at Tunoshna Airport, just outside the city of Yaroslavl, Russia. The team was traveling to Minsk to play their opening game of the season, with its coaching staff and prospects. Lokomotiv officials confirmed that the entire main roster was on the flight, including four players from the junior team. The bodies of Ukrainian teammates Sobchenko and Vitali Anikeyenko were repatriated following the crash for burial in Ukraine. The funeral was held on 10 September at Sovskoe cemetery in Kyiv.

Career statistics

See also
List of ice hockey players who died during their playing career

References

External links

1991 births
2011 deaths
Lokomotiv Yaroslavl players
Russian ice hockey centres
Russian people of Ukrainian descent
Sportspeople from Kyiv
Ukrainian ice hockey centres
Victims of the Lokomotiv Yaroslavl plane crash
Ukrainian expatriate sportspeople in Russia
San Jose Sharks draft picks